Mgr. Vincentius Setiawan Triatmojo, Lic., S.Th.  (born 5 April 1971) is an Indonesian Roman Catholic priest. He has been appointed as the bishop of Tanjung Karang on December 17, 2022. He is an diocesan priest from the Roman Catholic Archdiocese of Palembang. He is a  head of  the commission of liturgy, cathecetics, and bible.

Biography 
He was born on April 5, 1971, in Sindangjati, Tugumulyo, Palembang, South Sumatra, Indonesia. He studied theology and  philosophy at seminary in Pematang Siantar, North Sumatra, where he obtained his bachelor's degree. At the Institut Catholique de Paris he earned his postgraduate degree in theology in 2009. He was ordained as a priest in the Metropolitan Archdiocese of Palembang on January 25, 2000. After his priestly ordination, he became vicar of The Holy Trinity parish (2000-2001) and was then a parish priest in Plaju (2001-2006); in 2006 he transferred to Palembang. There he was director of youth commission from 2003 to 2009. On December 17, 2022 Pope Francis appointed him as bishop of Tanjungkarang.

References

External links 

1971 births
Living people
Institut Catholique de Paris alumni
21st-century Roman Catholic priests
Indonesian Roman Catholic priests
21st-century Roman Catholic bishops in Indonesia